Metriopelia is a genus of ground doves containing four species that live in the dry, upland habitats along the Andean mountain chain in South America. They have large wings and three species have orange skin around the eyes.

The genus was introduced by the French naturalist Charles Lucien Bonaparte in 1855 with the black-winged ground dove (Metriopelia melanoptera) as the type species. The name of the genus combines the Ancient Greek metrios meaning "modest" with peleia meaning "dove".

The four species in the genus are:
 Bare-faced ground dove (Metriopelia ceciliae)
 Black-winged ground dove (Metriopelia melanoptera)
 Golden-spotted ground dove (Metriopelia aymara)
 Moreno's ground dove (Metriopelia morenoi)

References

 

 
Bird genera
Taxa named by Charles Lucien Bonaparte
Taxonomy articles created by Polbot